SL-19 may refer to:

Strela, a Russian launch vehicle used from 2003-present
Rokot, a Russian launch vehicle used from 1990-present